Bangalaia sulcicollis is a species of beetle in the family Cerambycidae. It was described by Kolbe in 1893, originally under the genus Alphitopola. It is known from the Ivory Coast, Nigeria, Togo and Sierra Leone.

References

Prosopocerini
Beetles described in 1893